Cangetta fulviceps is a moth in the grass moth family Crambidae. It was described by George Hampson in 1917. It is found in Malawi.

References

Moths described in 1917
Spilomelinae